Cherokee County is a county located in the U.S. state of Oklahoma. As of the 2010 census, the population was 46,987. Its county seat is Tahlequah, which is also the capital of the Cherokee Nation.

Cherokee County comprises the Tahlequah, OK Micropolitan Statistical Area, which is included in the Tulsa-Muskogee-Bartlesville, OK Combined Statistical Area.

History

According to a historian, Cherokee County was established in 1907. However, the Encyclopedia of Oklahoma History and Culture, states that it was created from the Tahlequah District of the Cherokee Nation in 1906.

The Cherokee moved to this area as a result of the forced relocation brought about by the Indian Removal Act of 1830, also known as Trail Of Tears. The first significant settlements were at the site of Park Hill, where there was already a mission community, and Tahlequah, which became the seat of Cherokee government. However the Civil War divided the tribe and caused many of the early structures to be destroyed. Non-Indians began moving into the area illegally starting in the mid-1870s, and became the majority by the 1890s.

In 1851, the Cherokee Male Seminary opened in Tahlequah and the Cherokee Female Seminary opened in Park Hill. The latter burned down in 1887 and was rebuilt in Tahlequah. A 1910 fire destroyed the Male Seminary. The Female Seminary became Northeastern State Normal School after statehood in 1907 and is now part of Northeastern State University.

During 1901 – 1903, The Ozark and Cherokee Central Railway, which later became part of the St. Louis and San Francisco Railway was the first to build a track in the county. It boosted the shipment of farm products through the 1920s, but declined during the Great Depression. All rail service ceased in 1942.

Geography

The county lies in the foothills of the Ozark Mountains. It includes most of Tenkiller Lake and part of Fort Gibson Lake. The principal river running through it is the Illinois River. Grand River (Oklahoma) forms part of its western boundary.

Major highways
  U.S. Highway 62
  State Highway 10
  State Highway 51
  State Highway 82

Adjacent counties
 Delaware County (north)
 Adair County (east)
 Sequoyah County (south)
 Muskogee County (southwest)
 Wagoner County (west)
 Mayes County (northwest)

Demographics

As of the census of 2000, there were 42,521 people, 16,175 households, and 11,079 families residing in the county. The population density was 57 people per square mile (22/km2).  There were 19,499 housing units at an average density of 26 per square mile (10/km2). The racial makeup of the county was 56.41% White, 1.20% Black or African American, 32.42% Native American, 0.27% Asian, 0.04% Pacific Islander, 2.10% from other races, and 7.56% from two or more races. 4.14% of the population were Hispanic or Latino of any race. 92.7% spoke English, 3.8% Spanish and 2.7% Cherokee as their first language.

There were 16,175 households, out of which 32.70% had children under the age of 18 living with them, 52.50% were married couples living together, 11.90% had a female householder with no husband present, and 31.50% were non-families. 25.30% of all households were made up of individuals, and 9.00% had someone living alone who was 65 years of age or older. The average household size was 2.52 and the average family size was 3.04.

In the county, the population was spread out, with 26.30% under the age of 18, 14.60% from 18 to 24, 25.70% from 25 to 44, 21.50% from 45 to 64, and 12.00% who were 65 years of age or older. The median age was 32 years. For every 100 females there were 96.30 males. For every 100 females age 18 and over, there were 92.10 males.

The median income for a household in the county was $26,536, and the median income for a family was $32,369. Males had a median income of $25,993 versus $21,048 for females. The per capita income for the county was $13,436. About 17.00% of families and 22.90% of the population were below the poverty line, including 28.40% of those under age 18 and 13.80% of those age 65 or over.

Education

Primary & secondary education
Public K-12 school districts in the county include:

K-12 school districts:
 Fort Gibson Public Schools
 Hulbert Public Schools
 Kansas Public Schools
 Locust Grove Public Schools
 Oaks-Mission Public Schools
 Tahlequah Public Schools
 Westville Public Schools

Elementary school districts:
 Briggs Public School
 Grand View Public School
 Keys Public Schools
 Lowrey Public School
 Norwood Public School
 Peggs Public School
 Shady Grove Public School
 Tenkiller Public School
 Woodall Public School

Charter school:
 Cherokee Immersion School

Bureau of Indian Education (BIE)-affiliated tribal school:
 Sequoyah Schools

Colleges

Northeastern State University is the oldest institution of higher learning in the state of Oklahoma as well as one of the oldest institutions of higher learning west of the Mississippi River. Tahlequah is home to the capital of the Cherokee Nation of Oklahoma and about 25 percent of the students at NSU identify themselves as American Indian. The university has many courses focused on Native American linguistics, and offers Cherokee language Education as a major. Cherokee can be studied as a second language, and some classes are taught in Cherokee for first language speakers as well.

Politics
Despite the county being home to a significant Native American population and a wide Democratic registration advantage, the county has voted Republican in every presidential elections in the 21st century. Donald Trump beat Joe Biden 63%-34% in 2020. However, the county still will on occasion support local Democrats, as it narrowly voted for Democrat Drew Edmondson over Republican Kevin Stitt in the 2018 gubernatorial race.

Economy
Since statehood, the economy of Cherokee County has been based on agriculture, especially production of corn, wheat and vegetables. However, the percentage of the population engaged in farming has declined from 62 percent in 1940 to 4.4 percent in 1990. This is largely due to increased urbanization around Tahlequah since World War II. Agriculture remains very important. In 2002, this county ranked first in Oklahoma for the value of nursery and greenhouse crops and seventh in the state for poultry and eggs.  Illinois River and Lake Tenkiller tourism are perhaps of greater economic impact than agriculture, and both have lodging, water sports and recreation outfitters, fishing equipment and guides, eating and drinking establishments, campgrounds, festival events, and organizations for the conservation of resources.

Major non-agricultural employers in the county now include the Cherokee Nation government and Northeastern State University,

Communities

City
 Tahlequah (county seat)

Towns
 Fort Gibson
 Hulbert
 Oaks

Census-designated places

 Barber
 Briggs
 Caney
 Caney Ridge
 Cookson
 Dry Creek
 Eldon
 Etta
 Gideon
 Grandview
 Johnson Prairie
 Keys
 Lost City
 Lowrey
 Moodys
 Norwood
 Park Hill
 Peggs
 Pettit
 Pumpkin Hollow
 Rocky Ford
 Shady Grove
 Sparrowhawk
 Steely Hollow
 Tenkiller
 Teresita
 Welling
 Woodall
 Zeb

Other unincorporated
 Qualls

NRHP sites

The following sites in Cherokee County are listed on the National Register of Historic Places:

Notable citizens
 Bamboo Harvester, the horse who played television's Mr. Ed
 Sam Claphan, football player
 Robert Conley, author of numerous books about the Cherokee Indians
 Alice Brown Davis, Principal Chief of the Seminole Tribe of Oklahoma
 Wilma Mankiller, first female Principal Chief of the Cherokee Nation
 Jackson Narcomey, Muscogee Creek artist
 Wilson Rawls, author of Where the Red Fern Grows and Summer of the Monkeys
 Hastings Shade, Cherokee traditionalist and author
 Sonny Sixkiller, Cherokee football player
 Wes Studi, Cherokee actor

Notes

References

External links
 Encyclopedia of Oklahoma History and Culture - Cherokee County
 Oklahoma Digital Maps: Digital Collections of Oklahoma and Indian Territory

 
1907 establishments in Oklahoma
Populated places established in 1907